The Jesuit School of Theology of Santa Clara University is a Jesuit seminary within Santa Clara University and one of the member colleges of the Graduate Theological Union (GTU) in Berkeley, California. Prior to its merger with Santa Clara University it was known as the Jesuit School of Theology at Berkeley (JSTB).

Campus
JST is located two blocks north of the UC Berkeley campus, and about two blocks east of "Holy Hill", the central area of the Graduate Theological Union.  JST accepts students who are lay or ordained.

History
Originally established in 1934 at Los Gatos, California, as Alma College, JST was founded to serve the needs of the California and Oregon Provinces of the Society of Jesus.

In 1969, the school moved to Berkeley to join the Graduate Theological Union. That same year, its name was changed to the Jesuit School of Theology at Berkeley. JST is one of only two Jesuit-operated theological schools in the United States, the other being Boston College School of Theology and Ministry (formerly known as Weston Jesuit School of Theology) in Brighton, Massachusetts.

On 1 July 2009, Jesuit School of Theology at Berkeley merged with Santa Clara University, becoming Jesuit School of Theology of Santa Clara University. As such, JST followed the lead of the aforementioned Weston Jesuit School of Theology, which completed its affiliation with Boston College in June 2008.

Academic program and accreditation
JST is accredited by the Western Association of Schools and Colleges, the Association of Theological Schools, and by the Vatican's Congregation for Catholic Education as a Pontifical university. In addition to participating in the Doctor of Philosophy (Ph.D.) program of the Graduate Theological Union, the JST offers the following degrees:
    
Civil Academic Degrees
 Master of Arts in Theology (MAT)
 Master of Arts in Biblical Languages
 Master of Divinity (M.Div.)
 Master of Theological Studies (MTS)
   
Pontifical Academic Degrees
 Bachelor of Sacred Theology (STB)
 Licentiate of Sacred Theology (STL)
 Doctor of Sacred Theology (STD)

Notable alumni 
 Chris Donahue (M.Div / Th.M. 1989), Academy Award-winning film producer
 Robert W. McElroy (S.T.L. 1985), American cardinal; sixth bishop of the Diocese of San Diego.

See also
 Alma College, Alma, California
 Boston College School of Theology and Ministry
 Graduate Theological Union
 List of Jesuit sites
 Santa Clara University
 Society of Jesus

References

External links
JST home page
Jesuit Community at JST
Former website 

Roman Catholic Diocese of Oakland
Catholic seminaries in the United States
Seminaries and theological colleges in California
Universities and colleges in Alameda County, California
Santa Clara University Schools and Colleges
Schools accredited by the Western Association of Schools and Colleges
Educational institutions established in 1934
1934 establishments in California
Graduate Theological Union